Powerhouse or power house may refer to:

 Power station, a facility (or former facility) for the generation of electric power

Businesses
 Powerhouse (shop), a former electrical goods chain in the United Kingdom
 Powerhouse Animation Studios, an animation studio
 powerHouse Books, a Brooklyn-based publisher of high-end art and photography books
 Dick Smith Electronics Powerhouse, a chain of electronics stores operating in Australia and New Zealand

Power stations 

 Power House (Alcatraz), a power station on Alcatraz Island
 Powerhouse Museum, former power station, now science and technology museum in Sydney, Australia
 The Powerhouse (San Luis Obispo, California), former power station on the campus of California Polytechnic State University

Venues 
Powerhouse (club), a gay club in Newcastle upon Tyne, UK
 Brisbane Powerhouse, a performing arts center in Brisbane, Queensland, Australia
 Powerhouse, a club overlooking Albert Park and Lake in Melbourne, Australia
 Powerhouse Theater, a collaboration between New York Stage and Film and Vassar College

Literature
 The Power-House, a 1916 novel by John Buchan
 Powerhouse (comics), comic book characters 
 "Powerhouse", a short story by Eudora Welty

Music

Artists
 Powerhouse (rock band), a British hard rock band which formed after the breakup of the band Geordie in 1984
 Powerhouse (1997 band), reached #38 in the UK with "Rhythm of the Night" in December 1997
 Powerhouse (1999 band), responsible for 1999's "What You Need"
 Eric Clapton and the Powerhouse, a British blues studio supergroup formed in 1966
 "Powerhouse", an alias used by the composer Simon Power for his 1988 hit "On the Floor"

Albums
 Powerhouse (Deep Purple album), 1977
 Powerhouse (The Jazz Crusaders album), 1969
Powerhouse (Mustasch album), 2005
Powerhouse (Planningtorock album), 2018
 Powerhouse (White Heart album), 1990

Songs 
 "Powerhouse" (instrumental), a 1937 composition by Raymond Scott

Television
 Powerhouse (TV series), a 1982 United States television series
 Power House (talkshow), a Filipino talkshow

Other uses 
 Powerhouse Arts District, Jersey City
PowerHouse (programming language), a 1980s programming language by Cognos Corporation
 Powerhouse (video game), a 1995 computer game by Impressions Games, now part of Vivendi SA
 Powerhouse fruits and vegetables, or superfoods, describing foods with supposed health benefits
 Powerhouse Hobbs (born 1991), ring name of professional wrestler William Hobson